Wentworth Young (born c. 1930) was a Canadian football player who played for the Winnipeg Blue Bombers and BC Lions. He played college football at the University of British Columbia.

References

Living people
1930s births
Canadian football guards
BC Lions players
Winnipeg Blue Bombers players